Joel Lamangan (born September 21, 1952) is a Filipino film director, television director and actor. His award-winning films includes The Flor Contemplacion Story, Sidhi, Deathrow, Hubog, Aishte Imasu 1941, Blue Moon and Mano Po.

On August 19, 2008, Lamangan directed his first indie movie "Walang Kawala" produced by DMV Entertainment. It stars Polo Ravales and Joseph Bitangcol, with the special participation of Jean Garcia. Joel also directs Obra and will soon start shooting Desperadas 2. He started production for the next Sine Novela: Una Kang Naging Akin starring Angelika dela Cruz, Wendell Ramos, and Maxene Magalona.

In the 2013 Elections, he ran as congressman for Cavite's 1st District under the Lakas-CMD/United Nationalist Alliance/Partido Magdalo. However he backed out in the race.

In 2013, Lamangan was named as the artistic director of Gantimpala Theater Foundation. Lamangan will direct an original musical titled "Katipunan: Mga Anak ng Bayan" and it will star actors Sandino Martin and Anna Fegi. The show toured in August and September 2013 around provinces of Manila to celebrate the 150th anniversary of the birth of Philippine hero, Andres Bonifacio.

Lamangan is a member of the international Order of DeMolay from Baja Chapter, Cavite City. He was conferred with the highest honor being a DeMolay to the rank of Legion of Honor on November 14, 2015, by the Grand Master Victor Antonio T. Espejo of the Supreme Council Order of DeMolay Philippines for outstanding leadership in his field of endeavor, for service to humanity, for success in fraternal life, including adult service to the Order of DeMolay. The Supreme Council Order of DeMolay is an appendant body of Freemasonry.

Filmography

Film

As director
1990s
Darna (1991)
Hiram na Mukha (1992)
Ngayon at Kailanman (1992)
Ikaw (1993)
Kadenang Bulaklak (1994)
Anghel Na Walang Langit (1994)
Kapantay Ay Langit (1994)
Pangako ng kahapon (1994)
Silakbo (1995)
The Flor Contemplacion Story (1995)
Muling Umawit ang Puso (1995)
Bakit May Kahapon Pa? (1996)
The Sarah Balabagan Story (1997)
Pusong Mamon (1998) (co-directed with Eric Quizon)
Sidhi (1999)
Warat: Bibigay Ka Ba? (1999)
Bulaklak ng Maynila (1999)

2000s
Deathrow (2000)
Abandonada (2000)
Hubog (2001)
Mila (2001)
Mano Po  (2002)
Bahid (2002)
Filipinas (2003)
Ang Huling Birhen sa Lupa (2003)
Walang Kapalit (2003)
So... Happy Together (2004)
Aishite Imasu 1941: Mahal Kita (2004)
Mano Po III: My Love (2004)
Sabel (2004)
I Will Survive (2004)
Ako Legal Wife (Mano Po 4?) (2005)
Mano Po 5: Gua Ai Di (2006)
ZsaZsa Zaturnnah Ze Moveeh (2006)
Pacquiao: The Movie (2006)
Manay Po (2006)
Blue Moon (2006)
Bahay Kubo: A Pinoy Mano Po! (2007)
Desperadas (2007)
Silip (2007)
Happy Hearts (2007)
Desperadas 2 (2008)
Walang Kawala (2008)
Manay Po 2: Overload (2008)
Mano Po 6: A Mother's Love (2009)
I Luv Dreamguyz (2009)
Heavenly Touch (2009)
Fuschia (2009)
Dukot (2009)
Sagrada Familia (2009)
When I Met U (2009)

2010s
Sigwa (2010)
Mamarazzi (2010)
Patikul (2011)
The Mommy Returns (2012)
Migrante (2012)
Menor de Edad (2013)
The Bride and the Lover (2013)
Burgos (2013)
Lihis (2013)
Hustisya (2014)
Your Place or Mine? (2015)
Felix Manalo (2015)
Fruits N' Vegetables: Mga Bulakboleros (2016)
Ang Lalakeng Nangarap na Maging Vilma Santos (2016)
Flashmob Romance (2016)
That Thing Called Tanga Na (2016)
Siphayo (2016)
This Time I'll Be Sweeter (2017)
Bes and the Beshies (2017)
Bhoy Intsik (2017)
Foolish Love (2017)
Rainbow's Sunset (2018)
The Significant Other (2018)

2020s
Anak ng Macho Dancer (2021)
Bully'Kang: The First Adventure (2021)
My Father, Myself (2022)
Oras de Peligro (2023)

As actor
Kumander Dante (1988)

Television
Liwanag Ng Hatinggabi (1999–2000)
Maynila (2000)
Kung Mawawala Ka (2002–03)
Vietnam Rose (2005)
Asian Treasures (2007, co-director)
Sine Novela: Sinasamba Kita (2007)
Sine Novela: Pasan Ko Ang Daigdig (2007–08)
Babangon Ako't Dudurugin Kita (2008)
Sine Novela: Una Kang Naging Akin (2008)
Sine Novela: Paano Ba Ang Mangarap? (2009)
Adik Sa'Yo (2009)
Kahit Minsan Lang (2010) Starring Ivan Dorscner
Ikaw Sana (2009-2010)
Sine Novela: Basahang Ginto (2010)
Beauty Queen (2010)
Magic Palayok (2011)
Pahiram ng Isang Ina (2011)
Valiente (2012)
Enchanted Garden (2012)
Madam Chairman (2013)
Bakit Manipis ang Ulap? (2016)
Onanay (2018)
Pamilya Roces (2018)
Beauty Queens (2020)
Tadhana (2021)
FPJ's Batang Quiapo (2023)

Metro Manila Film Festival

References

External links

1952 births
Living people
Filipino film directors
Filipino television directors
Filipino LGBT actors
People from Manila
LGBT film directors
LGBT television directors
GMA Network (company) people